Hans Grodotzki (born 4 April 1936) was an East German long-distance runner who competed mainly in track events.

He competed for the United Team of Germany in the 1960 Summer Olympics held in Rome, Italy in the 10,000 metres where he won the silver medal. In the 5,000 metres he repeated this, winning a second silver medal.

Biography
Hans Grodotzki was born in Preußisch Holland, East Prussia, now Poland. The war ended in May 1945 and Grodotzki, accompanying his parents and two siblings, was obliged by frontier changes and ethnic cleaning to relocate.   The family ended up living in Menteroda, Thuringia, in the southern part of the Soviet occupation zone in what remained of Germany.   After leaving school Grodotzki worked as a miner in the Volkenroda Potash mines, also playing, in his free time, football and table tennis.   He began athletics training in 1954 after being "talent spotted".

While he was 20 he was called up for his military service, and in 1956 he was sent to the Army Sports Association centre at Potsdam.   A period of intensive training under Erich Bock ensued.  Already, 1956 he took the East German 5,000 meter junior record (14:18,0).  He was moved to Berlin in 1958, where he was trained by Curt Eins, and within half a year he was a member of the East Germany national team.

References 

1936 births
Living people
People from Pasłęk
Sportspeople from Warmian-Masurian Voivodeship
People from East Prussia
German male long-distance runners
East German male long-distance runners
Olympic athletes of the United Team of Germany
Olympic silver medalists for the United Team of Germany
Athletes (track and field) at the 1960 Summer Olympics
University of Potsdam alumni
National People's Army military athletes
Medalists at the 1960 Summer Olympics
Olympic silver medalists in athletics (track and field)